Fishs Eddy is a dinnerware, flatware and glassware retailer originally based in Gramercy Park, Manhattan, New York City that specializes in found dishes and serving pieces.

History 
Fishs Eddy was founded in 1986, when founders and current owners Julie Gaines and David Lenovitz got lost in Upstate New York and stumbled upon a small town named Fishs Eddy. Gaines and Lenovitz discovered an old barn during that trip that had stockpiled restaurant dishware that had survived a fire. They offered to buy the whole lot, took it back to their apartment in Manhattan and used the inventory to open a store at 889 Broadway, near Union Square.

A graphic novel about the history of the story, by Gaines and illustrated by her and Lenovitz's son, called Minding the Store, was published in 2018.

Aesthetic 
Fishs Eddy is known for offering archive and antique dinnerware, including plates and cups purchased from American Airlines and the Syracuse China Corporation. The company also produces some of its own dinnerware, with an aesthetic often called quirky. Its product line includes dinnerware with faces of American politicians and a skyline of New York City. As of September 2018, the store was considered a top retailer of wine decanters.

The store has also released dinnerware and other items created in collaboration with retailers and celebrities, including Alan Cumming, Todd Oldham, Amy Sedaris and West Elm.

References

Dinnerware designers
Companies based in New York City
American companies established in 1986
Retail companies established in 1986